SM UC-44 was a German Type UC II minelaying submarine or U-boat in the German Imperial Navy during World War I. The U-boat was ordered on 20 November 1915 and was launched on 10 October 1916. She was commissioned into the German Imperial Navy on 4 November 1916 as SM UC-44. In 6 patrols UC-44 was credited with sinking 28 ships, either by torpedo or by mines laid. UC-44 was sunk by the detonation of one of her own mines off the Irish coast at position  on 4 August 1917; its commander, Kurt Teppenjohanns, was the only survivor. UC-44s wreck was raised by the Royal Navy in September 1917 and later broken up.

Two aspects of her service are noteworthy. UC-44 was the first submarine to use the tactic of releasing oil and debris from her torpedo tubes to fool the enemy into believing it had been sunk by depth charges. Her actual sinking, sometimes claimed to be the result of British deception, also yielded intelligence that showed how little effect the Dover Barrage antisubmarine defences were having on the U-boats and forced changes in its command and operation before the year ended.

Design
A German Type UC II submarine, UC-44 had a displacement of  when at the surface and  while submerged. The submarine was powered by two six-cylinder four-stroke diesel engines each producing  (a total of ), two electric motors producing , and two propeller shafts.

UC-44 was fitted with six  mine tubes, eighteen UC 200 mines, three  torpedo tubes (one on the stern and two on the bow), seven torpedoes, and one  Uk L/30 deck gun. Her complement was twenty-six crew members.

Deception tactics

During a particularly intense depth charge attack on 15 February 1917, Kapitanleutnant Kurt Tebbenjohanns, UC-44's commander, ordered that the vessel's front torpedo tubes be filled with waste oil and other debris, then fired, simulating what might have been expected to reach the surface had the submarine sank. The ruse worked, and the attack was ended, allowing UC-44 to escape. Other U-boat commanders, and eventually their counterparts in other navies, adopted this deception tactic. It was particularly effective for the Germans at first, as British commanders were easily satisfied that they had sunk the enemy.

Sinking

In summer 1917 UC-44 was operating off Waterford Harbour on the southern coast of Ireland, laying mines and then re-laying them after British minesweepers had cleared the field. The Royal Navy officers in charge of the minesweeping surmised from the regularity with which this occurred and the haste with which the mines were laid that the Germans had broken their codes. Some of them later claimed that, realising this, they had the minesweeper run a dummy operation in mid-July, leaving all the mines in place and reporting that it had cleared them using the code suspected to have been broken, then closing the harbour to all shipping for two weeks. The hope was reportedly that a stricken U-boat would sink in shallow water where it and its contents could be recovered and examined by Room 40 and other departments of naval intelligence. however the historical record suggests that the British had not become aware of the compromised code and closed Waterford until after UC-44 sank.

UC-44 returned to Waterford to lay nine mines on the night of 4 August. After four had been successfully deployed west of the harbour, it set out to lay the other five in the centre. Tebenjohanns and two others managed to escape through the conning tower hatch, but the commander was the only one still alive when a British vessel swept the area for survivors an hour and a half later (another account suggests that another crewmember was found separately).

The British were pleasantly surprised that they had been fortunate enough to capture a U-boat commander. One officer who took tea with Tebenjohanns said the commander complained that the minesweepers had not done their jobs efficiently; they reportedly allowed him to share this news with his own superiors along with the report of his capture. When he was asked if the Germans had broken the code used by the British minesweepers, he said that as an officer he could not answer that, but the interrogator believed his demeanor and body language as he replied betrayed that the Germans had indeed done so.

Navy divers later reached the wrecked submarine to sweep it for intelligence, something the British had not previously been able to do with a sunken U-boat. They described the explosion damage as concentrated around UC-44's stern and engine room, near where the mine had been released from. This, along with the other eight mines being discovered and swept, suggests that the submarine sank when one of its own mines accidentally detonated while being laid, and not due to any deception operation by the Royal Navy, or as other accounts have it a leftover mine laid by UC-42

Intelligence recovered from UC-44 was greatly disturbing to the Admiralty. The submarine's logs showed that U-boats were passing the Dover Barrage at will; Tebenjohanns' standing orders were to pass the net on the surface at night when possible and dive no deeper than  if not. U-boats that for whatever reason bypassed the English Channel entirely and went around the northern tip of Scotland were advised to do so completely on the surface since that would lead the English to think the Dover defences were working. This discovery was a contributing factor to Reginald Bacon being relieved as commander of the Dover Patrol at the end of the year.

Summary of raiding history

See also

List of German U-boats
List of shipwrecks in August 1917

References

Notes

Citations

Bibliography

 
 

Ships built in Hamburg
German Type UC II submarines
U-boats commissioned in 1916
Maritime incidents in 1917
U-boats sunk by mines
U-boats sunk in 1917
World War I minelayers of Germany
World War I shipwrecks in the Celtic Sea
World War I submarines of Germany
1917 ships